Aliye Sultan ("nobleborn"; 24 August 1880 – 17 September 1903) was an Ottoman princess, the daughter of Sultan Murad V and Resan Hanım.

Early life
Aliye Sultan was born on 24 August 1880 in the Çırağan Palace, during her family's confinement in the palace after the disposal of her father. Her father was Murad V, son of Abdulmejid I and Şevkefza Kadın. Her mother was Resan Hanım She was the seventh child, and fourth daughter of her father and the second child of her mother. She had a sister, Fatma Sultan, one year elder than her. She take her name by Aliye Sultan, her father's sister died as child.

Illness and death

In 1903, Aliye Sultan had come down with a slight cold, but after the cold passed she could not recover her health. Slowly she began to weaken, even though no trace of her illness remained. The doctors found that her lungs were a bit weak and they felt she needed a change of air. And so her father sent her up to Yıldız Palace, although he was upset, because he was very close to all his children and did not want Aliye to leave too, as her half-sisters Hatice Sultan and Fehime Sultan had already left the Çırağan Palace in 1889 to get married and could not return to visit him because Abdülhamid II forbade it.

Aliye Sultan didn't recover from her illness, and died unmarried on 17 September 1903 at the age of twenty three. Abdülhamid II did not allow her parents or sister to see her before or after her death. She was buried in the mausoleum of Kapudan Pasha Mehmed Ali Pasha located in Eyüp Cemetery, Istanbul.  Her mother outlived her by seven years, dying in 1910. Her death, together with the scandal involving her daughter Hatice Sultan the following year, permanently undermined the health of Murad, who died shortly after in mid-1904.

In popular culture and literature
In the 2017 TV series Payitaht: Abdülhamid, Aliye Sultan is portrayed by Turkish actress Gökşin Saraç.
 Aliye is a character in Ayşe Osmanoğlu's historical novel The Gilded Cage on the Bosphorus (2020).

Ancestry

See also
 List of Ottoman princesses

References

Sources
 
 
 

1880 births
1903 deaths
Royalty from Istanbul
19th-century Ottoman princesses